Arne is a common masculine given name for males in Scandinavia. It is also a surname in England. 

The name Arne originates from the old Norse name Árni, which in turn is derived from the old Norse name for "eagle", Ǫrn. The oldest attestation of the name is from a runestone in Vagnhärad dating to the 11th century. 

The word arne also refers to the central stone on the floor of traditional Norwegian homes upon which the fire that provides the heating/cooking needs was lit. Similarly, "Arne" is Danish for the flame in a fireplace or old-fashioned oven or stove.

Given name

People
Arne Åhman (1925–2022), Swedish athlete
Arne Åkerson (born 1940), Swedish former Olympic sailor
Arne Andersen, several people
Arne Andersson (1917–2009), Swedish middle distance runner
Arne Arnardo (1912–1995), Norwegian circus performer and owner
Arne Arvidsson (1929–2008), Swedish association football player
Arne Bang-Hansen, Norwegian actor
Arne Beurling (1905–1986), Swedish mathematician
Arne Bjørndal (1882–1965), Norwegian musician, composer, and folklorist
Arne Borg, Swedish swimmer
Arne Carlson (born 1934), American politician
Arne Carlsson, several people
Arne Søby Christensen (born 1945), Danish historian
Arne Dahl (disambiguation), several people
Arne Domnérus (1924–2008), Swedish musician
Arne Duncan(born 1964), American politician
Arne Elsholtz (1944–2016), German voice dubbing artist
Arne Friedrich, German professional footballer
Arne Garborg (1851–1924), Norwegian writer
Arne Gaupset (1894–1976), Norwegian sport wrestler
Arne Gauslaa (1913–1942), Norwegian communist, newspaper editor, and resistance member
Arne L. Haugen (born 1939), Norwegian politician
Arne Høyer (1928–2010), Danish Olympic sprint canoer
Arne Ileby (1913–1999), Norwegian association football player
Arne Jacobsen (1902–1971), Danish architect and designer, exemplar of the "Danish Modern" style
Arne Jensen, several people
Arne L. Kalleberg (born 1949), American sociologist
Arne Kjörnsberg (born 1936), Swedish politician
Arne Korsmo (1900–1968), Norwegian architect
Arne Larsson, several people
Arne Løchen (1850–1930), Norwegian psychologist, philosopher, and literary researcher
Arne Maier (born 1999), German professional association football player
Arne Mattsson (1919–1995), Swedish film director
Arne Mellnäs (1933–2002), Swedish composer
Arne Mohlin, Swedish Army lieutenant general
Arne B. Mollén (1913–2000), Norwegian sports official
Arne Møller (born 1960), Norwegian former professional association football player
Arne Næss (1912–2009), Norwegian philosopher
Arne Næss Jr. (1937–2004), Norwegian businessman
Arne Nordheim, Norwegian composer
Arne Novák (1880–1939), Czech literary historian and critic
Arne Oldberg (1872–1962), American pianist, composer, and teacher
Arne Orrgård (born 1943), Swedish former sports shooter
Arne Øien (1928–1998), Norwegian economist and politician
Arne Larsen Økland (born 1954), Norwegian former association football player
Arne Rustadstuen, Norwegian Nordic skier
Arne aus den Ruthen, Mexican politician
Arne Pedersen (1931–2013), Norwegian association football player
Arne Pedersen (cyclist) (1917–1959), Danish cyclist
Arne Pettersen, Norwegian merchant seaman; last detainee on Ellis Island
Arne Petersen, Danish Olympic cyclist
Arne Røisland (1923–1980), Norwegian association football player
Arne Sandstø (born 1966), Norwegian association football manager and former player
Arne Selmosson (1931–2002), Swedish association football player
Arne Skoog (1913–1999), Swedish journalist
Arne Sletsjøe (born 1960), Norwegian mathematician and retired sprint canoer
Arne Sletsjøe (violist) (1916–1999), Norwegian violist
Arne Somersalo (1891–1941), Finnish officer and anti-communist activist
Arne Sorenson/Sørensen, several people
Arne Sølvberg (born 1940), Norwegian computer scientist
Arne Strid (born 1943), Swedish botanist
Arne Sunde (1883–1972), Norwegian officer, Olympic shooter, and two-time President of the United Nations Security Council
Arne Thomas (born 1975), German chemist
Arne Tiselius (1902–1971), Swedish biochemist, Nobel Prize in Chemistry laureate in 1948
Arne Toonen, Dutch film director
Arne Treholt, Norwegian politician and diplomat convicted for treason during the Cold War
Arne Vinje (1943–2011), Norwegian chess player
Arne Weise (1930–2019), Swedish journalist and television personality
Arne Zetterström (1917–1945), Swedish underwater diver and researcher

Lars-Arne Bölling (born 1944), Swedish former cross-country skiier
Odd-Arne Jacobsen (born 1947), Norwegian guitarist and songwriter
Per-Arne Håkansson (born 1963), Swedish politician
Tor-Arne Strøm (born 1952), Norwegian politician

Surname
Cecilia Arne, also known as Cecilia Young (1712–1789), English soprano, wife of Thomas and mother of Michael
Michael Arne (c. 1740–1786), English composer, son of Thomas
Peter Arne (1924–1983), British actor
Thomas Arne (1710-1778), English composer

Middle name
John Arne Riise (born 1980), Norwegian association football manager and former player
Odd Arne Westad (born 1960), Norwegian historian
Per Arne Olsen (1961–2022), Norwegian politician

Fictional characters
the title character of Arne Anka, a Swedish comic strip
Arne (daughter of Aeolus), mythological Greek princess
Arne Magnusson, a rude scientist in the video game Half-Life 2: Episode Two
Arne "One-Eye", a supporting character in the first two seasons of the television series Vikings
Arne Saknussemm, an alchemist and explorer in Jules Verne's novel Journey to the Center of the Earth
Arne Sithonis, mythologized Greek princess

See also
Arne & Carlos, duo of textile designers
Aarne
Arne (disambiguation) for other uses of the name

Masculine given names
Scandinavian masculine given names
Danish masculine given names
Norwegian masculine given names
Swedish masculine given names